Jill Hetherington was the defending champion but did not compete that year.

Conchita Martínez won in the final 6–1, 6–2 against Jo-Anne Faull.

Seeds
A champion seed is indicated in bold text while text in italics indicates the round in which that seed was eliminated.

  Conchita Martínez (champion)
  Belinda Cordwell (quarterfinals)
  Halle Cioffi (quarterfinals)
 n/a
  Sandra Wasserman (semifinals)
  Wiltrud Probst (first round)
  Donna Faber (second round)
  Maria Strandlund (second round)

Draw

References
 1989 Fernleaf Classic Draw

Singles
Singles
Fern